was a town located in Miike District, Fukuoka Prefecture, Japan.

As of 2003, the town had an estimated population of 14,525 and a density of 354.18 persons per km². The total area was 41.01 km².

On January 29, 2007, Takata, along with the towns of Setaka and Yamakawa (both from Yamato District), was merged to create the city of Miyama.

External links
Miyama official website  (some English content)

Dissolved municipalities of Fukuoka Prefecture
Populated places disestablished in 2007